Terentiy Lutsevich (till January 2013 his name was Tyenchen Vobga; ; ; born 19 April 1991) is a Belarusian professional football player from Cameroonian descent, currently playing for Naftan Novopolotsk.

References

External links
 
 

1991 births
Living people
Belarusian people of Cameroonian descent
Belarusian footballers
Association football defenders
Belarusian expatriate footballers
FC Minsk players
FC Dinamo Minsk players
FC Vitebsk players
FC Gomel players
FC Bereza-2010 players
FC Granit Mikashevichi players
FC Torpedo-BelAZ Zhodino players
FK Neftchi Farg'ona players
FC Smolevichi players
FC Kyzylzhar players
FC Belshina Bobruisk players
FC Naftan Novopolotsk players
Belarusian expatriate sportspeople in Uzbekistan
Belarusian expatriate sportspeople in Kazakhstan
Expatriate footballers in Uzbekistan
Expatriate footballers in Kazakhstan